Red Hot + Rio 2 is a collaborative album released June 28, 2011 as part of the Red Hot Organization's series of tribute music records that aim to raise money for HIV/AIDS awareness and prevention. The album aimed to pay homage to the influence of the Tropicália genre and cultural movement that arose in Brazil in the late 1960s. The Tropicália movement was noted for its genre-bending sound that melded influences of 'traditional' Brazilian music like samba, forro, and Bossa Nova with international styles of pop, rock, funk, and soul music. Likewise, Red Hot + Rio 2 included collaborations of some of the Brazilian artists that pioneered the Tropicália movement along with international artists from various genres.

The album was curated by Béco Dranoff and co-produced by John Carlin and Paul Heck. It was released in LP, CD, and digital forms and distributed by the Entertainment One record label. The album consists of 34 recordings, including both original compositions and cover songs, that feature collaborations among 60 international and Brazilian artists. It includes performances by Beck, David Byrne, Bebel Gilberto, John Legend, Os Mutantes, Caetano Veloso, and others. Producer John Carlin has stated that some of the artistic collaborations that appear on the album formed organically while others were 'constructed' or informed by Red Hot's previously established relationships.

Red Hot + Rio 2 is a follow up release to the 1996 album Red Hot + Rio, which was centered on the Brazilian genre of samba and the Bossa Nova sound. Red Hot + Rio 2 was immediately preceded in the benefit album series by Dark Was the Night (Beggars Banquet, 2009), which featured indie-rock artists such as The National, Feist, Grizzly Bear, Bon Iver, David Byrne and raised over $1 million for AIDS relief. The Red Hot Organization has not released information about the fundraising proceeds of Red Hot + Rio 2.

In anticipation of the album's release, Red Hot partnered with the Brooklyn Academy of Music (BAM) to host a live performance under the name Red Hot + Rio 2 at the BAM 2008 Next Wave Festival. The multi-night concert included performances by Bebel Gilberto, José González, Céu, Curumin, Otto, and others.

Track listing
CD1 (Red)
 Alice Smith + Aloe Blacc: "Baby"
 Beck + Seu Jorge: "Tropicália (Mario C 2011 Remix)"
 Mia Doi Todd + José González: "Um Girassol da Cor do Seu Cabelo"
 Quadron: "Samba de Verão"
 Vanessa da Mata + Seu Jorge & Almaz: "Boa Reza"
 John Legend: "Love I've Never Known"
 Aloe Blacc + Clara Moreno: "Nascimento (Rebirth) - Scene 2"
 Curumin: "Ela (Ticklah Remix)"
 Aloe Blacc + Alice Smith: "Baby (Old Dirty Baby Dub Version)"
 Superhuman Happiness + Cults: "Um Canto de Afoxé Para o Bloco do Ilê"
 Om'Mas Keith: "Mistérios"
 Forró in the Dark + Brazilian Girls + Angelique Kidjo: "Aquele Abraço"
 Mia Doi Todd: "Canto de Iemanjá"
 Caetano Veloso: "Terra (Prefuse 73 '3 Mellotrons in a Quiet Room' Version)"
 Marisa Monte + Devendra Banhart + Rodrigo Amarante: "Nú Com a Minha Música"
 Bebel Gilberto: "Acabou Chorare"
 David Byrne + Caetano Veloso: "Dreamworld: Marco de Canaveses"

CD2 (Hot)
 Beirut: "O Leãozinho"
 Tha Boogie: "Panis et Circenses"
 of Montreal + Os Mutantes: "Bat Macumba"
 Phenomenal Handclap Band + Marcos Valle: "Tudo o Que Você Podia Ser"
 Madlib + Joyce Moreno: "Banana [ft. Generation Match]"
 Marina Gasolina + Secousse: "Freak le Boom Boom"
 Money Mark + Thalma de Freitas + João Parahyba: "Tropical Affair"
 Los Van Van + Carlinhos Brown: "Soy Loco Por Ti, América"
 Orquestra Contemporânea de Olinda + Emicida: "Roda"
 Mayra Andrade + Trio Mocotó: "Berimbau"
 Apollo Nove + Céu + N.A.S.A.: "It's a Long Way"
 DJ Dolores + Eugene Hütz + Otto + Fred 04 + Isaar: "A Cidade"
 Javelin + Tom Zé: "Ogodô, Ano 2000"
 Atom™ + Toshiyuki Yasuda: "Águas de Março [ft. Fernanda Takai + Moreno Veloso]"
 Twin Danger: "Show Me Love"
 Rita Lee: "Pistis Sophia"

References

2011 compilation albums
Red Hot Organization albums
Albums produced by Madlib